Robles (Spanish for "oaks") may refer to:

Places

Argentina
Robles Department

United States
Robles Park, Tampa, Florida
Paso Robles, California
Robles Junction, Arizona

Other uses
Robles (surname), including a list of people with the name

See also
Los Robles (disambiguation)